Sandra Miju Oh  (born July 20, 1971) is a Canadian–American actress. She is best known for her starring roles as Rita Wu on the HBO comedy Arliss (1996–2002), Dr. Cristina Yang on the ABC medical drama series Grey's Anatomy (2005–2014) and Eve Polastri in the spy thriller series Killing Eve (2018–2022). She has received numerous accolades, including two Golden Globe Awards and four Screen Actors Guild Awards, and thirteen Primetime Emmy Award nominations. In 2019, Time magazine named Oh one of the 100 most influential people in the world.

Oh first gained recognition for her roles in the Canadian films Double Happiness (1994) and The Diary of Evelyn Lau (1994). Her later television credits include Judging Amy and American Crime, as well as voice roles on American Dad!, American Dragon: Jake Long, The Proud Family, Phineas and Ferb, Chop Socky Chooks, She-Ra and the Princesses of Power, and Invincible. In 2021, she played the lead role in the Netflix comedy drama series The Chair and was also one of the executive producers of the series. She has had notable supporting and leading performances in films such as Bean (1997), Last Night (1998), The Princess Diaries (2001), Long Life, Happiness & Prosperity (2002), Under the Tuscan Sun (2003), Sideways (2004), Wilby Wonderful (2004), Hard Candy (2005), Rabbit Hole (2010), Tammy (2014), Catfight (2016), and Meditation Park (2017), as well as voice roles in Mulan II (2004), The Land Before Time XIII: The Wisdom of Friends (2007), Over the Moon (2020), Raya and the Last Dragon (2021) and Turning Red (2022).

Oh won two Genie Awards for Best Performance by an Actress in a Leading Role for Last Night and Double Happiness and won a Gemini Award for Best Performance by an Actress in a Leading Role in a Dramatic Program or Mini-Series for The Diary of Evelyn Lau. She hosted the 28th Genie Awards in 2008, and became the first woman of Asian descent to host the Golden Globe Awards at the 76th ceremony in 2019. In March 2019, she became the first Asian-Canadian woman to host Saturday Night Live, and was the third actress of Asian descent to do so, after Lucy Liu in 2000 and Awkwafina in 2018. She was also the first actress of Asian descent to be nominated for the Primetime Emmy Award for Outstanding Lead Actress in a Drama Series and the first woman of Asian descent to win two Golden Globes. In addition to her Canadian citizenship, Oh has been a naturalized American citizen since 2018.

Early life
Sandra Miju Oh was born in Nepean, Ontario, on July 20, 1971, the daughter of middle-class South Korean immigrants Oh Young-nam, a biochemist, and Oh Jun-su (John), a businessperson. Her parents had moved to the area in the early 1960s. She has a brother, Ray, and a sister, Grace, and grew up in a Christian household, living on Camwood Crescent in Nepean, where she began acting and practicing ballet at age four to correct her pigeon-toed stance. Growing up, Oh was one of the few youths of Asian descent in Nepean.

At age ten, Oh played The Wizard of Woe in a class musical called The Canada Goose. Later, at Sir Robert Borden High School, she founded the environmental club BASE (Borden Active Students for the Environment), leading a campaign against the use of styrofoam cups. While in high school, she was elected student council president. She also played the flute and continued both her ballet training and acting studies, though she knew that she "was not good enough to be a professional dancer" and eventually focused on acting. She took drama classes, acted in school plays, and joined the drama club, where she took part in the Canadian Improv Games and Skit Row High, a comedy group. Against her parents' advice, she rejected a four-year journalism scholarship to Carleton University to study drama at the National Theatre School of Canada in Montreal, paying her own way.

Oh told her parents that she would try acting for a few years, and promised to return to university if it failed. Reflecting on forgoing university, she has said that she is "the only person in [her] family who doesn't have a master's in something". Soon after graduating from the National Theatre School in 1993, she starred in a stage production of David Mamet's Oleanna in London, Ontario. Around the same time, she won roles in biographical television films of two significant female Chinese-Canadians: as Vancouver author Evelyn Lau in The Diary of Evelyn Lau, where she won the role over more than 1,000 others who auditioned, and as Adrienne Clarkson in a CBC biopic of Clarkson's life.

Career

1994–2004: Early work
Oh came to prominence in her home country for her lead performance in the Canadian film Double Happiness (1994), playing Jade Li, a twenty-something Chinese-Canadian woman negotiating her wishes and those of her parents. The film received critical acclaim, with Roger Ebert praising Oh's "warm performance". Janet Maslin of The New York Times also praised her performance, saying: "Ms. Oh's performance makes Jade a smart, spiky heroine you won't soon forget." Oh won the Genie Award for Best Actress for the role. In 1995 she appeared in the Canadian film Little Criminals with a multi-scene, but uncredited, performance.

In 1997 she appeared in the film Bean, playing the supporting role of Bernice, the art gallery PR manager. Her other Canadian films include Long Life, Happiness & Prosperity and Last Night (1998), for which she again won a Best Actress Genie. She was cast in the drama Dancing at the Blue Iguana (2000), playing a stripper at an adult dance club opposite Daryl Hannah. The film received mediocre reviews, though Oh was praised for her performance. The New York Times review said, "Oh make[s] the most of [her] opportunity to explore the vulnerability below [her] characters' hard-edged surface." The same year, she appeared in the drama Waking the Dead. In 2002, Oh appeared in the family comedy Big Fat Liar, followed by a minor role in Steven Soderbergh's Full Frontal (2002).

Oh garnered critical acclaim for her six seasons as Rita Wu, the assistant to the president of a major sports agency, on the HBO series Arliss, receiving a nomination for an NAACP Image Award for Best Supporting Actress in a Comedy Series and a Cable Ace award for Best Actress in a Comedy for her work. She also made several guest appearances on the series Popular (1999) playing a humanities teacher and guest starred in the television series Kung Fu: The Legend Continues, Judging Amy, Six Feet Under and Odd Job Jack.

In theatre, Oh has also starred in the world premieres of Jessica Hagedorn's Dogeaters at the La Jolla Playhouse and Diana Son's Stop Kiss at Joseph Papp's Public Theater in New York City.

In 2003, she was cast in a supporting role opposite Diane Lane in Under the Tuscan Sun, followed by a supporting role in Alexander Payne's drama Sideways (2004). She considers Sideways and The Diary of Evelyn Lau to be the two best films she has made.

2005–2013: Grey's Anatomy
In 2005, Oh appeared in several films, including David Slade's controversial thriller Hard Candy; and the independent anthology drama 3 Needles (2005), opposite Chloë Sevigny and Olympia Dukakis, in which she plays a Catholic nun in an AIDS-stricken African village. The same year, Oh was cast as Cristina Yang in the first season of what became the hit ABC medical series Grey's Anatomy. Oh's long-running role on the show earned her both a 2005 Golden Globe Award for Best Supporting Actress in a Series and a 2006 Screen Actors Guild Award for Outstanding Performance by a Female Actor in a Drama Series. In July 2009, she received her fifth consecutive Primetime Emmy Award nomination as Best Supporting Actress in a Drama for her work on the series. In August 2013, Oh announced that the show's tenth season would be her final season.

In addition to her work on Grey's Anatomy, Oh continued to appear in films. She co-starred in the thriller The Night Listener (2006), alongside Robin Williams and Toni Collette; in the superhero comedy Defendor (2009); Ramona and Beezus (2010); and in the critically acclaimed drama Rabbit Hole (2010), opposite Nicole Kidman and Aaron Eckhart.

In her only audiobook, she played Brigid O'Shaughnessy in a Grammy-nominated dramatization of The Maltese Falcon (2008), which also featured Michael Madsen and Edward Herrmann. She also has done a few voice roles in animation, including a few guest appearances in American Dragon: Jake Long, the voice of Princess Ting-Ting in Mulan II, and the voice of Doofah in The Land Before Time XIII: The Wisdom of Friends.

Oh was the host of the 28th Genie Awards on March 3, 2008. In 2009, Oh performed in The People Speak, a documentary feature film that uses dramatic and musical performances of the letters, diaries, and speeches of everyday Americans, based on historian Howard Zinn's A People's History of the United States. During the off-season hiatus from filming Grey's Anatomy in 2010, Oh took the part of Sarah Chen in the British crime drama, Thorne. She undertook intensive dialect coaching in order to play her British character.

On June 28, 2011, it was announced that Oh would receive a star on Canada's Walk of Fame; she was inducted on October 1 at Elgin Theatre in Toronto. In 2013, Oh formally announced that she would be leaving Grey's Anatomy at the end of the tenth season. Oh exited the series with the season 10 finale.

2014–present: Film roles and Killing Eve

In October 2014, Oh announced that she would be teaming up with Canadian director Ann Marie Fleming to collaborate on an animated feature film titled Window Horses. She also appeared in a supporting role in the comedy film Tammy (2014), playing the wife of Kathy Bates' character.

In 2015, she starred on the Refinery29 comedy web series Shitty Boyfriends. Oh began filming the comedy film, Catfight (2016), in New York City in December 2015. In 2017, Oh starred as Abby Tanaka in the third season of the anthology drama series American Crime.

Beginning in April 2018, Oh began a leading role in the BBC iPlayer spy thriller series Killing Eve, playing British intelligence agent Eve Polastri whose quarry is psychopathic assassin Villanelle (played by Jodie Comer), with the two women developing a mutual fascination. Upon reading the series script, Oh did not realize she was being considered for a leading role, stating that she had been "brainwashed" by years of being typecast as the leads' best friend. The series was renewed for a second season ahead of its debut, and a third was announced less than a day after the second premiered in the United States. Killing Eve was also renewed for a fourth season shortly after.

Oh has garnered critical acclaim for her performance on the series, with Jenna Scherer describing her in Rolling Stone as "a compulsively watchable actor – expressive and complex, blending wry wit and deep pathos." When Vulture declared Oh the best actress currently on television, critic Matt Zoller Seitz wrote: "It's a tour de force performance, yet so self-effacing and invisible in its effects that you come away thinking that you've seen a crackling yarn with compelling characters rather than a cultural landmark. This is a magic trick of a high order." In 2018, Oh became the first actress of Asian descent to be nominated for the Primetime Emmy Award for Outstanding Lead Actress in a Drama Series, for that role. She won the Golden Globe Award for Best Actress – Television Series Drama, becoming the first woman of Asian descent to win two Golden Globe Awards. Oh won Outstanding Performance by a Female Actor in a Drama Series at the SAG Awards in 2019.

From 2018 to 2020, Oh voiced the role of Castaspella in the animated superhero series She-Ra and the Princesses of Power. In 2019, she co-hosted the 76th Golden Globe Awards, alongside Andy Samberg. Oh became the first woman of Asian descent to host the awards show. In March 2019, she became the first Asian-Canadian woman to host Saturday Night Live, and only the third actress of Asian descent, after Lucy Liu in 2000 and Awkwafina in 2018. In 2021, Oh voiced Virana, the chieftess of the Fang tribe in the Disney animated film Raya and the Last Dragon.

Oh voices the role of Debbie Grayson in the animated superhero drama series Invincible. The series, based on the comic book series of the same name, premiered on Amazon Prime Video in 2021.

In 2021, Oh served as executive producer and had the lead role in the Netflix comedy-drama series The Chair.

In 2022, Oh voiced the role of Ming Lee, the strict and overprotective mother of the main character in the Pixar animated film Turning Red. She joined Lynne Ramsay's adaptation of Margaret Atwood's short story collection Stone Mattress.

Personal life
Oh was in a relationship with filmmaker Alexander Payne for five years. They married in January 2003, separated in early 2005, and divorced in late 2006.

On July 8, 2013, Oh received the key to the city of Ottawa from Mayor Jim Watson.

Oh practices Vipassanā, a Buddhist form of meditation. Her work in acting is informed by a loose creative collective that teaches "creative dream work", which reportedly fuses Jungian dream analysis with method acting and aims to bring one's "subconscious work into consciousness".

Oh became a US citizen in 2018. On the first anniversary of her citizenship, she discussed it while hosting Saturday Night Live and referred to herself as an "Asian-Canadian-American".

Oh was awarded the National Arts Centre Award from the Governor General of Canada in 2019, as a part of the Governor General's Performing Arts Awards.

In June 2022, Oh was named an officer of the Order of Canada. Later in that year, she was one of a number of recent inductees to the Order to be included in the Canadian delegation to the state funeral of Queen Elizabeth II.

Activism 

On March 22, 2021, Oh gave a speech at a Stop Asian Hate rally in Pittsburgh, Pennsylvania, in response to the Atlanta spa shootings. She encouraged people "to reach out to the Asian American community", stating that they were "very scared".

"I'm gonna be very, very brief, but one thing I know, many of us in our community are very scared, and I understand that, and one way to try to kind of go through– get through our fear is to reach out to our communities.....I will challenge everyone here: if you see something, will you help me? If you see one of our brothers and sisters in need, will you help us?...I am proud to be Asian! I wanna hear you say, I am proud to be Asian! I belong here! I am proud to be Asian! I belong here! Many of us don't get the chance to be able to say that, so I just wanted to give us an opportunity to be able to shout that."

Filmography

Film

Television

Awards and nominations

Among her accolades, she has received two Golden Globe Awards and four Screen Actors Guild Awards, as well as nominations for thirteen Primetime Emmy Awards.

See also
 Eve Polastri
 Koreans in New York City

References

External links

 
 
 

1971 births
Living people
20th-century Canadian actresses
21st-century Canadian actresses
Canadian film actresses
Canadian television actresses
Canadian voice actresses
Actresses from Ottawa
Best Drama Actress Golden Globe (television) winners
Best Supporting Actress Golden Globe (television) winners
Best Actress Genie and Canadian Screen Award winners
National Theatre School of Canada alumni
Outstanding Performance by a Cast in a Motion Picture Screen Actors Guild Award winners
Outstanding Performance by a Female Actor in a Drama Series Screen Actors Guild Award winners
Canadian actresses of Korean descent
Canadian expatriate actresses in the United States
21st-century American actresses
People with acquired American citizenship
American film actresses
American television actresses
American voice actresses
American actresses of Korean descent
Theatre World Award winners
Officers of the Order of Canada